The following is a list of volumes and chapters of the completed Japanese manga series Kodomo no Jikan, written and illustrated by Kaworu Watashiya and published in Japan by Futabasha in the monthly seinen manga magazine Comic High!. Since serialization began on May 22, 2005, 71 chapters have been collected in ten tankōbon to date. At one point, an English language version of the manga was licensed for distribution in North America by Seven Seas Entertainment under the title Nymphet, but the Los Angeles–based company ultimately decided not to publish it due to controversies over its content. An anime adaptation of the series — roughly covering the first twenty chapters of the manga, albeit with plot points and scenes lifted from later installments and featuring an original ending — aired on Japanese television between October 12, 2007, and December 28, 2007, containing twelve episodes.

He is placed in charge of class 3–1, where one of his students, a mischievously precocious eight-year-old girl named Rin Kokonoe, develops an intense crush on him. Though he does his best to discourage her efforts, she nevertheless continues with her aggressive campaign to win his affections in spite of the problems that ensue that are her attempt to get closer to him. The situation is further complicated not only by the often complex, intertwining relationships existing between them and their respective friends, families, and peers, but also by the everyday life lessons they all learn together, as well as from each other.

List of tankōbon volumes and manga chapters

In keeping with the academic setting, the untitled chapters of Kodomo no Jikan are called , which means "class period" in English. This same naming convention is employed in the manga series Negima!: Magister Negi Magi by Ken Akamatsu.

Notes and references

Kodomo no Jikan